Jagne is a Gambian surname that may refer to
Ablie Jagne (died 2015), Gambian footballer
Baboucarr-Blaise Jagne (born 1955), foreign minister of the Gambia
Ismaila Jagne (born 1984), Gambian football midfielder
Modou Jagne (born 1983), Gambian footballer
Omar Jagne (born 1992), Gambian football forward 
Pa Modou Jagne (born 1989), Gambian association football player
Saihou Jagne (born 1986), Swedish-Gambian football striker